Thomas Fane (died 1607), of Burston, Hunton, Kent, was an English politician.

He was a Member of Parliament for Dover, Kent, in 1589, 1593 and 1597. He was the younger brother of Thomas Fane (died 1589), Sheriff of Kent and ancestor of the Earl of Westmorland.

References

16th-century births
1607 deaths
Members of the Parliament of England for Dover
English MPs 1589
English MPs 1593
English MPs 1597–1598
People from Hunton, Kent

Year of birth unknown